Julio Enrique Monagas Park (Spanish: Parque Julio Enrique Monagas, sometimes referred to as Parque nacional Julio Enrique Monagas) is an urban state park and recreational area located in Bayamón, Puerto Rico. The park is named after Julio Enrique Monagas, the first director of Puerto Rico's Public Recreation and Parks Commission and also considered the father of the Olympic movement in Puerto Rico. Before its establishment in 1993, the area was a military installation during the Second World War, and many of the bunkers and ammunition warehouses are still preserved within the area. The park today contains several hiking trails, paths for mountain biking, playgrounds for children, gazebos for picnics, and areas for horse-riding. Climbing is also allowed in some of the limestone cliffs, locally known as mogotes.

The park is managed by the Compañía de Parques Nacionales de Puerto Rico, which serves as the department of parks and recreation of the territory, although everyday management is done by the Centro Ambiental Santa Ana, established by Frank H. Wadsworth in 2006.

References 

Parks in Puerto Rico
Protected areas of Puerto Rico
Bayamón, Puerto Rico
1993 establishments in Puerto Rico
Protected areas established in 1993